Jingyu County, formerly Méngjiāng County until February 1946, is a county in southern Jilin province, People's Republic of China. It is under the administration of Baishan City. It is named after General Yang Jingyu, who was killed here during World War II.

Administrative divisions
There are seven towns and five townships under the county's administration.

Geography and climate
Jingyu is located in southern Jilin and the northern part of Baishan City on the upper reaches of the Songhua River amidst the western periphery of the Changbai Mountains. The bordering county-level divisions are Fusong County to the east, Jiangyuan District to the south, Huinan to the west, and Huadian to the north.

Jingyu has a monsoon-influenced, humid continental climate (Köppen Dwb), with long, bitterly cold winters, and short, warm and rainy summers. Spring and autumn are short with some rainfall. The frost-free period lasts only 104 days.

References

External links

 
Baishan
County-level divisions of Jilin
Songhua River